Melvin Capital Management LP is an American investment management firm based in New York City. It was founded in 2014 by Gabriel Plotkin, who named the firm after his late grandfather.

On May 18, 2022 Plotkin announced that the fund would close and return any remaining customer funds by June 2022. Assets under management in April 2022 were about $7.8 billion. 

Melvin Capital invested primarily in technology and consumer stocks and was reported to have $8billion in assets under management (AUM) as of January 2021. During the GameStop short squeeze of 2021, they sustained losses of 53% or $6.8 billion, at one point losing more than a billion dollars a day; in Q1 2021, the firm's assets declined 49%, and it finished 2021 down more than 39% on the year, during which the S&P 500 rose 28.7%. Melvin Capital began January 2022 down 17%.

History

Background
After graduating from Northwestern University with a degree in economics in 2001, Gabriel Plotkin joined Ken Griffin's hedge fund Citadel LLC, and later Connecticut-based hedge fund North Sound Capital. Prior to starting Melvin Capital, Plotkin was a trader at Steve Cohen's SAC Capital, where he managed a portfolio of mostly consumer stocks valued at about $1.3 billion. 

During his time at SAC Capital, Plotkin was the recipient of illegal insider information according to federal prosecutors. Reuters identified Plotkin as the so called "Portfolio Manager B" in the Securities and Exchange Commission's civil complaint against Michael Steinberg, a fellow SAC PM who was arrested on charges he traded Dell's earnings based on insider information. Plotkin was allegedly forwarded several emails by Steinberg and others that contained insider information.

Foundation and performance before 2021

Plotkin founded Melvin Capital, after leaving SAC during the insider trading blowup, in late 2014, naming the fund after his late grandfather who was a small-business owner. He raised nearly $1 billion. CIO Gabe Plotkin described the fund to Bloomberg as “a very human-intensive place. We have a lot of analysts, we require a lot out of them”. He also said that the fund has an "intense focus" on the short side (i.e. short selling). 

In its first full year in operation, Melvin Capital had returns of 47%, ranking it 2nd in Bloomberg's 2015 list of top-performing funds with $1 billion or more in assets under management.

In 2015, nearly two-thirds of the fund’s 67% returns (before fees) derived from its short positions. Notable short positions included bets against J.C. Penney Co. and renewable-energy company SunEdison Inc., both of which ultimately went bankrupt. 

In 2017, the fund finished up 41%. Notable investments included Chewy.com, Amazon.com, Las Vegas Sands, Alibaba, and shorting GameStop.

According to The Wall Street Journal, about one-third of the gains in 2019 from Steve Cohen's current hedge fund, Point72, came from Melvin Capital Management LP.

In September 2020 the name of company showed up in the Polish Short Sale Registry because of a short position in game developers CD Projekt, a net position of 0.55 percent through the Polish stock exchange (GPW). They gained considerably due to the problems faced during the launch of Cyberpunk 2077.

Melvin charges investors an annual management fee of 2% and up to 30% of its profits, among the highest fee packages in the hedge fund industry.

2021 losses

In early 2021 the fund lost over 30% due to numerous short bets that went awry, including GameStop. Users of the subreddit r/WallStreetBets made widespread bets that GameStop's stock would increase in value. In January, Ken Griffin's Citadel and Steve Cohen's Point72 invested $2.75 billion in Melvin in exchange for non-controlling revenue shares of the fund. CNBC's Andrew Ross Sorkin reported that fund manager Gabriel Plotkin advised Melvin Capital had closed (i.e. covered) its short position in GameStop on January 26 in the afternoon, although CNBC could not confirm the amount that Melvin Capital lost. Melvin Capital also contended that rumors of the fund intending to file for bankruptcy are false. On January 27 Bloomberg News reported that losses had continued past the 30% reported on January 24 by the WSJ although their sources would not give a specific number as to not upset CIO Gabe Plotkin. The fund had also repositioned its portfolio according to the source. During the height of the squeeze, Melvin was reportedly losing more than a billion dollars a day.

The short position adopted by Melvin Capital and others resulted in more than 139% of existing shares of GME being shorted, making GameStop stock the most shorted equity in the world. Through the end of January 2021, the fund was down 53%, according to The Wall Street Journal. In February, Melvin posted a 22% gain; even with this addition, Melvin will need to produce an additional 75% gain for earlier clients before they break even. At the end of Q1 2021, Melvin reported losses of 49%, at the close Q2 2021, Melvin was reported to be down 46% on the year, and as of November 2021, Melvin was reported to be down 42% on the year. Melvin finished 2021, a year during which the S&P 500 rose 28.7%, down more than 39%.   

Subsequent to the GameStop short squeeze event, Melvin Capital disclosed that it is the target of at least nine lawsuits relating to its behavior during that period. Allegations include Melvin's participation in a conspiracy against retail investors, and also that Melvin "made misstatements about their role in the conspiracy to the public." Melvin contends that these lawsuits are "without merit."

2022
In May 2022, Bloomberg News reported that Melvin Capital planned to close its funds and return the cash to its investors by June 30.

Executives 
The fund was led by Founder & CIO Gabriel "Gabe" Plotkin. According to Forbes, Plotkin earned about $300 million in compensation in 2017, making him the 20th highest paid hedge fund manager that year. In December 2020 Plotkin purchased 2 adjacent houses in Florida for $44 million. Plotkin purchased a minority interest in the Charlotte Hornets in 2019 from Michael Jordan. According to Bloomberg, during 2020 Plotkin earned over $800 million in compensation. However, during January 2021, he reportedly lost $460 million due to his funds collapsing. 

David F. Kurd was the firm's COO.

References

External links
 Melvin Capital website

Investment management companies of the United States
2014 establishments in New York (state)
Companies based in New York City
American companies established in 2014